Unpacking is a puzzle video game developed by Witch Beam and published by Humble Bundle for Microsoft Windows, macOS, Linux, Nintendo Switch, Xbox One, Xbox series, PlayStation 4, and PlayStation 5. The game received positive reviews, two BAFTA Game Awards, was chosen as game of the year by Eurogamer.

Gameplay 
The game is divided into stages named by the years in which they take place: 1997, 2004, 2007, 2010, 2012, 2013, 2015, and 2018. The gameplay in each stage comprises unpacking a female character's possessions from boxes into a new dwelling, representing significant life events. The player is tasked with fitting each unpacked item into the living space, learning the protagonist's life story through her items and the places she lives.

There are eight stages made up of a total of 35 rooms.

Development 

Unpacking was developed by Witch Beam, an independent game studio based in Brisbane, Australia. The studio was founded in 2013 and had previously released Assault Android Cactus, a twin-stick shooter, in 2015. The game was first conceptualized by Wren Brier when she moved in with her partner, Witch Beam co-director Tim Dawson, in early 2018. She found that unpacking unlabelled boxes, not knowing what is stored inside, was an experience that could be translated into a video game. The two participated in the Stugan games accelerator program in Sweden, and the game entered full production in early 2019.

Unpacking is mostly a wordless experience, with the narrative mainly told through objects the player unpacks from boxes. The team put a lot of thought into making Unpackings accessible: The nearly wordless nature of the game ensures that anyone who may have language or comprehension barriers can still enjoy playing the game, and many additional accessibility features were implemented.

The sound design includes over 14,000 foley effects, with multiple pick-up and placement sound effects unique to each item.

Release
While Witch Beam managed most of the game's social media channels, the team recruited Victoria Tran, the community director of Among Us, to help operate Unpackings Discord channel and TikTok account. The team initially expected development of the game to take about a year and a half, though actual production of the game took twice as long. Unpacking was released for personal computers, Nintendo Switch and Xbox One on November 2, 2021. Versions for PlayStation 4 and PlayStation 5 were released on May 10, 2022. Physical versions of the game, published and distributed by Limited Run Games, were available for preorder between March 29 and May 1, 2022.

Reception 

Unpacking received "generally favorable" reviews, according to review aggregator Metacritic. The game received positive reviews from Rock Paper Shotgun, GameSpot, Eurogamer, Nintendo Life, IGN, Kotaku, TouchArcade, It sold over 100,000 copies across all platforms in its first ten days. GamesRadar+ praised it for its innovative narrative, and it was awarded a Can I Play That? award for its accessibility. The game was nominated for  Game of the Year at the Gayming Awards 2022 and won Best LGBTQ Indie Game and Authentic Representation. Unpacking also won 2 IGDA Global Industry Game Awards in 2022. One for 2D Animation and another for 2D Environment Art.

Unpacking was named one of the best video games of 2021 by The New Yorker, Los Angeles Times, Forbes, the Financial Times, CNET, and NME. Eurogamer selected Unpacking as their Game of the Year.

Awards

References

External links 

2021 video games
Humble Games games
LGBT-related video games
Linux games
MacOS games
Nintendo Switch games
PlayStation 4 games
PlayStation 5 games
Puzzle video games
Retro-style video games
Video games developed in Australia
Video games featuring female protagonists
Video games scored by Jeff van Dyck
Video games set in the 1990s
Video games set in the 2000s
Video games set in the 2010s
Witch Beam Games
Windows games
Xbox One games
BAFTA winners (video games)
Interactive Achievement Award winners
Game Developers Choice Award winners
Indie video games
Single-player video games